South Tapanuli (Tapanuli Selatan in Indonesian Language, abbreviated Tapsel) is a regency in North Sumatra, Indonesia. Its seat is the town of Sipirok. This regency was originally very large and contained thousands of towns and villages, including the city of Padang Sidempuan. The areas that have separated from South Tapanuli Regency are the new regencies of Mandailing Natal, Padang Lawas Utara and Padang Lawas, all lying to the south-east of the residual South Tapanuli Regency, plus the city (kota) of Padang Sidempuan. After the division, the regency seat moved to from Padang Sidempuan to Sipirok.

The regency covers an area of 4,355.35 square kilometers and had a population of 264,108 at the 2010 census and 300,911 at the 2020 Census. These figures exclude the city of Padang Sidempuan, which is virtually surrounded by South Tananuli territory but is independently administered.

There are several attractions in the regency, including Lake Marsabut and Lake Siais. The language used by the people is the Angkola Batak language. The majority religion of the population is Islam. An airport is located at Aek Godang in Hulu Sihapas District, North Padang Lawas Regency.

Administration
At the 2010 Census, the regency was divided into twelve districts (kecamatan). Subsequently, three additional districts (Tano Tombangan Angkola, Angkola Muara Tais and Angkola Sangkunur) have been created by the division of existing districts. The districts are tabulated below with their areas and their populations at the 2010 Census and 2020 Census. The table also includes the locations of the district administrative centres, the number of administrative villages (desa and kelurahan, 248 in total) in each district and its post code.

Notes:
(a) the 2010 population of the new Tano Tombangan Angkola District is included in the figure for Sayur Matinggi District, from which it was split off.
(b) the 2010 population of the new Angkola Muara Tais District is included in the figure for Batang Angkola District, from which it was split off.
(c) the 2010 population of the new Angkola Sangkunur District is included in the figure for Angkola Barat District, from which it was split off.

Geography

Location 
To the north, the district is bordered by the Central Tapanuli Regency and North Tapanuli Regency. The regency borders the Padang Lawas Regency in the east, and to the north, the west and the south it borders the Mandailing Natal Regency. In the middle of the South Tananuli Regency is Padang Sidimpuan City, which is entirely surrounded by this Regency.

Sights

Sights include a waterfall in Damparan Hauntas, in Saipar Dolok Hole District.

Archaeology
The Padang Lawas archaeological site is partly located in the regency. The site covers approximately 1,500 km² in this regency and in the Padang Lawas and North Padang Lawas regencies.

Wildlife 
The critically endangered Tapanuli orangutan lives in the region. It was described as a distinct species in 2017 and represents the first extant species of great ape to be described since the bonobo in 1929. Scientists identify new species of great ape, Pongo tapanuliensis or Tapanuli orangutan, but fear its survival is already in doubt as habitat under threat.

References

Sources
Simanjuntak, Truman, M. Hisyam, Bagyo Prasetyo, Titi Surti Nastiti (éds.), Archaeology: Indonesian perspective : R.P. Soejono's festschrift, LIPI, Jakarta, 2006, 

 
Regencies of North Sumatra